Technical death metal (also referred to as  tech-death) is a musical subgenre of death metal that began and developed in the early- to mid-1990s, with particular focus on challenging, demanding instrumental skill and complex songwriting.

Technical experimentation in death metal began in the late 1980s and early 1990s by four bands that are often grouped together as "technical death metal's Big Four" – Death, Pestilence, Atheist, and Cynic – as well as Nocturnus; all but Pestilence being part of the Florida death metal scene.

Some of the distinct features of this genre include dynamic song structures, complex and atypical rhythmic structures, abundant use of diminished chords and arpeggios, frequent employment of odd time chord progressions, and constant use of string skipping on the guitars. Bass lines are usually complex, and the drums are extremely fast-paced with abundant use of blast beats and other extreme drumming techniques. The technical death metal genre has also been influenced by mostly jazz fusion, as well as thrash metal and progressive/technical-inspired heavy metal bands like Death, Megadeth, Slayer, Voivod, Kreator, Dark Angel, Coroner, Sadus, and Watchtower, the latter of whose second album Control and Resistance (1989) is often considered to be one of the sources of inspiration for the genre.

The 1990 album The Key by Nocturnus has been cited as the first progressive death metal album. One of the key works that cemented the subgenre was Atheist's debut album Piece of Time, also released in 1990, which took death metal into a more intricate level while incorporating influences ranging from jazz fusion to progressive metal. In 1991, New York death metal group Suffocation released their debut album Effigy of the Forgotten, which focused on pairing speed and brutality with a "sophisticated" sense of songwriting. Atheist's second album Unquestionable Presence, Pestilence's third album Testimony of the Ancients, and Death's fourth album Human were all released the same year, defining the path for death metal's newly found intricateness and having proved to be especially influential on later 1990s and 2000s technical death metal bands.

See also 

 List of technical death metal bands

Notes

 
Death metal
Extreme metal